Nikolaos Christogiannopoulos (1916 – 1991) was a Greek fencer. He competed in the individual and team sabre events at the 1948 Summer Olympics.

References

1916 births
1991 deaths
Greek male sabre fencers
Olympic fencers of Greece
Fencers at the 1948 Summer Olympics